Vegas is a New Zealand drama television series which officially premiered on TVNZ 2 on 19 April 2021 at 8:30 pm. The series was released on TVNZ On Demand on the same date at 9:30 pm. Vegas was co-created by Michael Bennett and Harriet Crampton and produced by Greenstone TV, 10,000 Company, and Steambox Film Collective with support from NZ On Air and TVNZ Te Reo Tataki.

The 6-part series is set in the fictional tourist town of Wairoto (a thinly anonymised Rotorua). A drug deal gone wrong on a blood-stained night sets off a chain of events for dangerous factions and an innocent bystander in this action-thriller series. Vegas stars Eds Eramiha (The Legend of Baron To’a), Cian Elyse White (Cousins), Katie Wolfe and Rena Owen (Once Were Warriors). Filmed entirely on location in Rotorua.

Vegas is the first mainstream television production in New Zealand to be helmed by a predominantly Māori cast and crew.

Vegas was the third-highest streamed show on TVNZ On Demand in 2021, reaching an average audience of 92.660 New Zealanders per episode. It then doubled that audience with its TVNZ 2 viewership.

Toro Studios created the title sequence Into The Flames composed by Mahuia Bridgman-Cooper, lyrics written and performed by Maaka Pōhatu and the Modern Māori Quartet, with additional performance by Awhimai Fraser and Te Ohorere Williams. Karyn Rachtman is the Music Supervisor.

The series is written by Michael Bennett, based on the novel Inside the Black Horse by Ray Berard.

Paul Lear won Best Post Production Design 2021 for Vegas.

Cast 
 Cian Elyse White as Toni Poulan
 Eds Eramiha as Kīngi Duncan
 Katie Wolfe as Hinapouri Phillips
 Rena Owen as Rāwina Duncan
 Te Kohe Tuhaka as Wiremu Poulan
 Jim Moriarty as Henry Ruata
 Alex Tarrant as Arsenio (Joe) Hamilton
 RickyLee Russell-Waipuka as Ruthie Hato
 Dahnu Graham as Junior Nepia
 Dean O'Gorman as Ryder Harrison
 Akinehi Munroe as Arihia Poulan
 Ezra Tapsell as Tyrone Wells
 Michelle Ang as Miranda Lau
 Evander Brown as Pio Duncan
 Kahukura Royal as Nikau Poulan
 Daniel Sing as Mike Young
 Xavier Horan as Mātia (Mātz) Phillips
 Miriama Smith as Annie Poulan
 Wayne Hapi as Waka Phillips
 Gary Young as Huàng Duc Minh
 Te Awarangi Puna as Erina Teuber
 Nathaniel Lees as George Smiley
 Vela Manusaute as Big Smiley
 Abi Turner as Felicity Carr-Fry

Episodes

References 

 https://www.tvnz.co.nz/shows/vegas
 https://e-tangata.co.nz/arts/story-sovereignty-belongs-with-the-people/
 https://calicopublishing.co.nz/wp-content/uploads/2016/10/Ray-Berard-Inside-the-Black-Horse-Sales-Sheet.pdf
 https://d3r9t6niqlb7tz.cloudfront.net/media/documents/NZOA_Annual_Report_2021_FINAL_web.pdf

External links 
 “Watch Vegas” on TVNZ+
 

New Zealand drama television series
2021 New Zealand television series debuts